Simonas Stankevičius (born 3 October 1995) is a Lithuanian retired international footballer who played as a striker.

Early and personal life
Stankevičius was raised in Panevėžys. His mother was a semi-professional tennis player and his grandfather was also a professional footballer.

Club career
Stankevičius started his youth career in his hometown of Panevėžys before moving to the National Football Academy in Kaunas at the age of 14. He was scouted by English club Leicester City after playing under-16 youth international football for Lithuania.

He joined Nuneaton Town on a two-month loan on 21 November 2014.

On 28 August 2015, Stankevičius joined Oldham Athletic on a three-month loan deal.

On 12 January 2016, Stankevičius signed for Žalgiris. He moved on loan to Croatian club Šibenik in August 2016.

He was bought by Norwegian First Division club Mjøndalen on 18 February 2017. He finished his career later that season with Egersund.

International career
He made his international debut for Lithuania in 2013.

Retirement
Stankevičius announced his retirement from football in 2017 at the age of 22, citing his lack of love for playing football as the reason for his surprising retirement. He has since worked in programming and intended to gain a science degree.

Career statistics

Club statistics

International statistics

References

1995 births
Living people
Lithuanian footballers
Lithuania international footballers
Leicester City F.C. players
Nuneaton Borough F.C. players
Oldham Athletic A.F.C. players
FK Žalgiris players
HNK Šibenik players
Mjøndalen IF players
Egersunds IK players
National League (English football) players
English Football League players
A Lyga players
First Football League (Croatia) players
Norwegian First Division players
Association football forwards
Lithuanian expatriate footballers
Lithuanian expatriate sportspeople in England
Expatriate footballers in England
Lithuanian expatriate sportspeople in Croatia
Expatriate footballers in Croatia
Lithuanian expatriate sportspeople in Norway
Expatriate footballers in Norway